"Now thank we all our God" is a popular Christian hymn. Catherine Winkworth translated it from the German "", written  by the Lutheran pastor Martin Rinkart. Its hymn tune, Zahn No. 5142, was published by Johann Crüger in the 1647 edition of his Praxis pietatis melica.

Background

Martin Rinkart was a Lutheran pastor who came to Eilenburg, Saxony, at the beginning of the Thirty Years' War. The walled city of Eilenburg became the refuge for political and military fugitives, but the result was overcrowding, deadly pestilence and famine. Armies overran it three times. The Rinkart home was a refuge for the victims, even though he was often hard-pressed to provide for his own family. During the height of a severe plague in 1637, Rinkart was the only surviving pastor in Eilenburg, conducting as many as 50 funerals in a day. He performed more than 4,000 funerals in that year, including that of his wife.

Rinkart was a prolific hymn writer. In Rinkart's  (Leipzig, 1636), "" appears under the title "", as a short prayer before meals. The exact date is debated, but it is known that it was widely sung by the time the Peace of Westphalia was signed in 1648. Johann Crüger published it in the 1647 edition of his Praxis pietatis melica.

Text

Below is the text in a modern version from the German hymnal Evangelisches Gesangbuch, and a 19th-century translation by Catherine Winkworth:

Melody 

The melody is sometimes attributed to Rinkart, but it is usually considered to be by Johann Crüger, who first published it.

Musical settings 

It is used in J.S. Bach's cantatas, such as BWV 79, 192 (music lost), harmonized for four voices in BWV 252 and 386, and set in a chorale prelude, BWV 657, as part of the Great Eighteen Chorale Preludes. The now-standard harmonisation was devised by Felix Mendelssohn in 1840 when he adopted the hymn, sung in the now-standard key of F major and with its original German lyrics, as the chorale to his Lobgesang or Hymn of Praise (also known as his Symphony No. 2).

Max Reger composed a chorale prelude as No. 27 of his 52 Chorale Preludes, Op. 67 in 1902. The late-Romantic German composer Sigfrid Karg-Elert used it in his Marche Triomphale. In 1969 Mr. Jo Mama also used Martin Rinkart's hymn to write a song entitled We Must Rejoice. ("For 2 tubas, 2 violas, and Organ with vibraphone"). John Rutter composed Now thank we all our God for choir and brass in 1974. In 1977 Czech-American composer Václav Nelhýbel arranged a contemporary setting entitled Now Thank We All Our God: Concertato for 2 trumpets, 2 trombones and organ with tuba and timpani which incorporated "Nun Danket alle Gott" for congregational singing. Hermann Chr. Bühler made an elaborate setting of Johann Crüger's version.

Leuthen Chorale
It is claimed that after the Battle of Leuthen in 1757, the hymn was taken up by the entire assembled Prussian army. This narrative is however questioned by historians and musicologists, who identify the story as a later invention of Prussian propaganda. Because of this story the melody is sometimes known as the Leuthen Chorale.

References

External links 

 
 Evangelisches Gesangbuch 321 (melody and text in 3 languages) l4a.org
 "Now Thank We All Our God" (score and audio version) on the website of the Center for Church Music
 Hymns Without Words lyrics and recording available for download

17th-century hymns in German
English Christian hymns
Lutheran hymns
Thanksgiving songs